Zasu may refer to:

ZaSu Pitts (1894-1963), American movie actress
Zasu Knight, actress in Buffy the Vampire Slayer adult parodies 
Zasu, Master of the seat, head of the temple (abbot) in Sōkan, the Japanese system of rankings for Buddhist clergy
Zasu River or Yazoo River, a river in the U.S. state of Mississippi
Zasu, a Thoroughbred horse, winner of the 1974 Champagne Stakes (Australia) and 1975 Queensland Oaks
Zasu, game developed by defunct company Enix

See also 
Zazu (disambiguation)